Starchild is the sixth studio album by American R&B singer Teena Marie, released on November 11, 1984 by Epic Records. Following the relative commercial failure of her previous album, Robbery, Starchild became the highest-selling album of Marie's career.  It peaked at #9 on the US Black Albums chart and #31 on the Billboard Albums chart.  It was certified Gold by the RIAA on April 1, 1985.

The album's success was driven by lead single "Lovergirl" which become a major US hit, reaching #4 on the Billboard Hot 100 and her only top 30 hit on that chart. Marie also received a nomination for Best Female R&B Vocal Performance for the single at the 27th Grammy Awards-her second nomination in that category.

The album was written and produced by Marie, with contributions from Leon Ware and Narada Michael Walden. The track "My Dear Mr. Gaye" is a tribute to Marvin Gaye, who had been fatally shot and killed by his father on April 1, 1984.

It was re-released by SoulMusic Records in 2012 as an Expanded Edition, containing 5 mixes as bonus tracks (see track listing below).

Track listing
All songs written by Teena Marie, except where noted.
 "Lovergirl" – 4:54
 "Help Youngblood Get to the Freaky Party" (Bendrix, Marie) – 5:44
 "Out on a Limb" – 6:37
 "Alibi" (Marie, Fred Mirza) – 5:23
 "Jammin" – 5:52
 "Starchild" – 5:35
 "We've Got to Stop (Meeting Like This)" (Duet With Ronnie McNeir) – 5:07
 "My Dear Mr. Gaye" (Marie, Penny "P.J." Johnson, Leon Ware) – 5:28
 "Light" – 1:17
Expanded Edition
 "Lovergirl" (US Single Edit) - 3:59
 "Lovergirl" (US Special 12" Dance Mix) - 5:53
 "Lovergirl" (US Single - Instrumental) - 6:10
 "Jammin'" (Dance Mix - Long Version) - 8:20
 "Out on a Limb" (US 12" Single Edit) - 5:31

Personnel

Credits for Starchild adapted from Allmusic

Walter Afanasieff - synthesizer
Larkin Arnold - executive producer
Bobby Brooks - engineer, mixing
Pattie Brooks - voices
Wyman Brown - synthesizer
Rick Butz - assistant engineer
Darren Carmichael - synthesizer
Paulinho Da Costa - percussion
Nathan East - bass
Elmer Flores - assistant engineer
Dave Frazier - engineer
James Gadson - drums
Preston Glass - guitar
Billy Griffin - vocals, backing vocals
Bernie Grundman - mastering
Mickey Hearn - vocals, backing vocals, voices
Dann Huff - guitar
James Jamerson, Jr. - bass
Jill Jones - vocals, backing vocals
Randy Kerber - piano, synthesizer
Deni King - assistant engineer

Gary Lane - art direction
Teena Marie - arranger, cover art, cover art concept, drum machine, guitar, percussion, piano, producer, programming, synthesizer, vocals, voices
Yvette Marine - vocals, backing vocals, voices
Tom McDermott - guitar
Allen McGrier - bass, drum machine, programming, vocals
Richard McKernan - assistant engineer
Ronnie McNeir - vocals
Fred Mirza - synthesizer
Moreno - assistant engineer
P.J. - cover art concept, backing vocals, voices
Dan Radlauer - synthesizer
John Robinson - drums
Corrado Rustici - guitar
Ron Slenzak - photography
T.O. - voices
Dave Taylor - guitar
Julia Tillman Waters - vocals, backing vocals
Gary Wagner - assistant engineer
Narada Michael Walden - drums
David T. Walker - guitar
Leon Ware - vocals, backing vocals
Ernie Watts - saxophone, soloist
Michael White - drums
Tim Wild - airbrushing, artwork
Maxine Willard Waters - vocals, backing vocals

Singles
"Lovergirl" #4 US Pop Singles/ #9 US Black Singles
"Jammin'" #81 US Pop Singles/ #45 US Black Singles
"Out on a Limb" #56 US Black Singles

References

1984 albums
Teena Marie albums
Epic Records albums
Freestyle music albums